Leo Morandi (14 September 1923 – 2 May 2009) was a promoter of the new post-World War II commercial ceramics industry of Sassuolo, Italy. At first he collaborated with local ceramic producers (Marazzi Group) and with Industries D'Agostino in Salerno, Italy. In 1954, after selling an innovative patent to Ceramiche Marazzi (biscuit selection unit), he was able to initiate startup of his own equipment supply business. Leo Morandi's innovations, knowledge, and experience aided growth and advancement throughout the Sassuolo ceramic companies, which in the 1960s constituted the worldwide known Sassuolo tile district.

Impact on industry
In particular, he used two electrodes to select the biscuit; the passage of electricity through the material showed that it was not suitable for the successive glazing.

The production chain for ceramic tiles was then mainly handcrafted and labour-intensive, but Leo Morandi's inventions started the successful automation of various units. After the initial years he was able to open a distinct efficient production unit. Morandi was a reserved man and did not like publicity. He involved his workers and customers in the improvement of his inventions and innovations.

Ceramic industry equipment examples include: automated floor tile edge glaze remover, automated packaging (floor tiles where historically bound with thin iron wire, before shipment), specialized silk screen machines, the peristaltic pump, the transport line, the hydraulic press, tile overturning mechanism, press reception unit, and glazing applications done with disk booths. These basic tile processing elements are still in use.

Leo Morandi began exporting these proven automated Italian ceramic industry innovations to Spain, allowing advancement of two primary ceramic industry clusters.

Licences of Officina Morandi Leo, Sassuolo
1945 - 1 December	Licence n.424701
Device to abrade automatically the enamel from the edges of the floor tiles for covering.
		
1958 - 14 June	Licence n.592220	
System to fasten with iron threads tiles of geometrical shape. 
		
1958 - 1 August	Licence n.598125	
Machine to remove automatically from the tiles the enamel strains left on the edges during the humid glazing 
	
1958 - 1 August	Licence n.593124	
Device to brush tiles on both sides with a single passage.
		
1958 - 2 August	Licence n.593126	
Automatic machine to remove from the tiles the slobbers left by the stamps on the edges.
		
1958 - 2 August	Licence n.593127	
Pump for dense liquids, particularly for vitreous enamel in watery suspension for the ceramic industry.
		
1958 - 25 September	Licence n.595789	
Machine to retrieve the vitreous enamel of the tiles which result defective after the humid glazing.
		
1959 - 6 April 	Licence n.606642	
Procedure to manufacture enameled tiles with dull edges.
		
1960 - 7 April 	Licence n.629034	
Automatic machine in order to collect into a pile humid tiles coming from the press.
		
1961 - 7 April 	Licence n.646867	
Conveyor for ceramic floor tiles.
		
1961 - 7 April 	Licence n.646866	
Device to turn over the tiles on the conveyor.
		
1961 - 15 April	Licence n.647228	
Machine to divide the tiles by thickness.
		
1962 - 28 March	Licence n.685219	
Hydraulic system, consisting in a press actioned by mostly self-feeding cylinders.
		
1968 - 13 March	Licence n.832329	
Automatic machine to apply screen printed decorations to tiles.
		
1973 - 6 Decembers	Licence n.1001087	
Device to distribute the tiles being part of a row.
		
1973 - 6 Decembers	Licence 1001086	
Device to empty the baking supports of tiles.

1978 - 12 April	Licence n.1104063	
Perfected device with rotary discs to nebulize and evenly distribute enamels to be applied on tiles. 
		
1978 - 3 July	         Licence n.28979B
Glazing cabin with rotary discs to nebulize and evenly distribute enamels to be applied on tiles.

Image gallery

External links
Officine Morandi, official site

Sources
 Margherita Russo: Distretto industriale e servizi di trasporto. Il caso della ceramica, Franco Angeli, Milano, 1990 
 Margherita Russo: Cambiamento tecnico e relazioni tra imprese. Il distretto ceramico di Sassuolo, Rosenberg & Sellier, Torino, 1996 
 Alberto Lusoli: Internazionalizzazione dei distretti
Il distretto ceramico di Sassuolo  

1923 births
2009 deaths
People from Sassuolo
Ceramic engineering
20th-century Italian businesspeople